Kalaketty is a village in the Erumely panchayath of Kanjirappally tehsil in the Kottayam district of Kerala state, India. Many Shiva devotees pass through Kalaketty during the Makaravilakku festival period, as the local temple is an important landmark as well as an idathavalam for them. One of the famous Malayalam movie Varnapakittu was shot at this place.

Location
Kalaketty is located on the Mundakkayam - Kanamala route. The footpath to Sabarimala passes through Kalaketty, which starts from Peroorthodu near Erumely.

References

Villages in Kottayam district